Mary E. Miller (née Meyer; born August 27, 1959) is an American politician serving as the U.S. representative for Illinois's 15th congressional district since 2021. She serves on the House Committee on Agriculture and the Committee on Education & Labor. Miller is a member of the Freedom Caucus and has been described as on the "far right" of the Republican Party.

Early life and education 
Born in Oak Park, Illinois, to Annette (Jesh) and Harvey Meyer, Miller graduated from Naperville Central High School in Naperville, Illinois. She earned a Bachelor of Science in business management and did some graduate coursework in education at Eastern Illinois University, but did not complete a graduate degree.

U.S. House of Representatives

Elections

2020 

Miller announced her candidacy to represent  in the United States House of Representatives in the 2020 elections to succeed retiring incumbent John Shimkus. She won the Republican Party nomination, the real contest in Illinois's most Republican district, and won the general election with over 70% of the vote. Miller focused her campaign on providing support to farming and bringing manufacturing back to Illinois.

Miller sided with President Donald Trump's false claims that the 2020 presidential election was compromised by voter fraud, calling it "tainted".

2022 

In May 2022, the Washington Examiner criticized Miller for employing Bradley Graven, "a man convicted of soliciting sex with a minor, to assist with her re-election campaign." Graven was also seen driving Miller around, raised money for her campaign, and was reportedly responsible for collecting over half the signatures needed to qualify her for the ballot.

After the 2020 redrawing of the Illinois electoral map, Miller won the June 2022 Republican primary by approximately 14 points against fellow incumbent Rodney Davis, whose more moderate views became a liability in the newly redrawn 15th district. Miller had also been endorsed by Donald Trump; Davis had supported the ultimately unsuccessful formation of a January 6 commission in May 2021. Redistricting left her home in Oakland just outside the district. Members of the House are required only to live in the state they represent.

Tenure
On January 6, 2021, when Congress met to formally count the votes of the Electoral College and certify the results of the 2020 presidential election, Miller was one of the members of the House of Representatives who objected to the votes of Arizona and Pennsylvania.

Caucus memberships 
 Freedom Caucus
Republican Study Committee

Political positions 
Miller is a member of the Freedom Caucus and has been described as being on the "far right" of the Republican Party.

LGBT rights 
On March 2, 2021, Miller introduced the Safety and Opportunity for Girls Act, which would ban transgender girls in schools from using bathrooms that correspond to their gender identity.

Miller criticized House Speaker Nancy Pelosi on the Equality Act and same-sex marriage, saying, "She doesn't represent the American people, and Americans need to wake up and realize that the Left does not represent the traditional values of the American people."

Miller voted against the Respect for Marriage Act, which codified parts of Obergefell v. Hodges. She wrote in a post, "This attacks the traditional family. All of these initiatives are deeply unpopular with the American people, and I will always vote NO against the radical agenda of the Left."

President Biden and the Biden administration
Miller has accused President Joe Biden of having a plan to "flood our country with terrorists, fentanyl, child traffickers, and MS-13 gang members", and also said that "under President Biden's leadership the left has weaponized the federal government to go after the American people. We face an unprecedented assault on the American way of life by the radical left."

Miller has supported efforts to impeach Biden. During the 117th United States Congress, Miller was co-sponsor of four resolutions to impeach Biden.

During the 117th Congress, Miller also co-sponsored resolutions to impeach Attorney General Merrick Garland and Secretary of State Antony Blinken. Early in the 118th Congress, she co-sponsored a resolution to impeach Secretary of Homeland Security Alejandro Mayorkas.

Capitol Police medals 
In June 2021, Miller was one of 21 House Republicans to vote against a resolution to give the Congressional Gold Medal to police officers who defended the U.S. Capitol on January 6.

Foreign policy

Europe
In February 2022, Miller co-sponsored the Secure America's Borders First Act, which would prohibit the expenditure or obligation of military and security assistance to Ukraine over the U.S. border with Mexico.

Miller voted against H.R. 7691, the Additional Ukraine Supplemental Appropriations Act, 2022, which would provide $40 billion in emergency aid to the Ukrainian government.

Miller was one of 18 Republicans to vote against Sweden and Finland joining NATO.

Middle East and Africa
In June 2021, Miller was one of 49 House Republicans to vote to repeal the AUMF against Iraq.

Miller was one of 15 representatives to vote against H.R. 567: Trans-Sahara Counterterrorism Partnership Program Act of 2021, which would establish an interagency program to assist countries in North and West Africa to improve immediate and long-term capabilities to counter terrorist threats, and for other purposes.

In 2023, Miller was among 47 Republicans to vote in favor of H.Con.Res. 21, which directed President Joe Biden to remove U.S. troops from Syria within 180 days.

Myanmar
On March 19, 2021, Miller was one of 14 House Republicans to vote against a measure condemning the Myanmar coup d'état that overwhelmingly passed, for reasons reported to be unclear.

Abortion 
On June 25, 2022, the day after the Supreme Court of the United States issued Dobbs v. Jackson Women's Health Organization, which overturned Roe v. Wade and Planned Parenthood v. Casey, Miller spoke at a rally with Donald Trump and called the decision a "historic victory for white life". Later that night, her spokesman said that Miller had misread her notes and meant to say "right to life".

Immigration 
Miller sponsored Representative Brian Babin's bill, H.R.140 - Birthright Citizenship Act of 2021, which would eliminate birthright citizenship.

Miller sponsored H.R. 6202, the American Tech Workforce Act of 2021, introduced by Representative Jim Banks. The legislation would establish a wage floor for the high-skill H-1B visa program, thereby significantly reducing employer dependence on the program. The bill would also eliminate the Optional Practical Training program that allows foreign graduates to stay and work in the United States.

Religious freedom 
Miller has called for the return of the role of God in public schools. She has also expressed support for Christian nationalism.

Family leave 
Miller introduced and sponsored H.R.1980 - Working Families Flexibility Act of 2021. This bill would cap the accrual of any non-union employee, per year, to 160 hours of compensated time off in lieu of overtime pay (the equivalent of 20 days if working 8 hours a day, or 4 weeks if calculated by a 40-hour work week) and prohibits the interference of employers with regard to forcing an employee to take the compensated time off.

Unions 
Miller sponsored H.R.6579 - Teamwork for Employees and Managers Act of 2022, which would require companies to put workers on the board. This has been described as "company unions".

Trade 
Miller expressed support for then-President Donald Trump's protectionist trade policies, expressing the feeling that farmers were taken advantage of in past trade deals such as NAFTA.

Big Tech 
In 2022, Miller was one of 39 Republicans to vote for the Merger Filing Fee Modernization Act of 2022, an antitrust package that would crack down on corporations for anti-competitive behavior.

Comment about Hitler
On January 5, 2021, two days into her House term, Miller issued a prepared speech to the conservative group Moms for America. She quoted Adolf Hitler, saying: "Each generation has the responsibility to teach and train the next generation. You know, if we win a few elections, we're still going to be losing unless we win the hearts and minds of our children. This is the battle. Hitler was right on one thing: he said, 'Whoever has the youth has the future.'"

A number of groups and politicians condemned the comment, criticized Miller, and urged the Republican party to do likewise. Illinois GOP Chairman Tim Schneider called her language "wrong and disgusting" and urged Miller "to apologize". Public statements were issued by the U.S. Holocaust Memorial Museum, Anti-Defamation League (ADL), World Jewish Congress, and multiple lawmakers, including Adam Kinzinger and Illinois governor J. B. Pritzker. U.S. Representative Jan Schakowsky, U.S. Senator Tammy Duckworth, and the Illinois legislative Jewish caucus called for Miller's resignation. On January 14, Schakowsky said that she would introduce a measure to censure Miller.

On January 7, Miller's office tweeted that her remarks had been intended to compare alleged youth indoctrination efforts by "left-wing radicals" to those of Hitler, while nonetheless encouraging Republicans to aggressively appeal to the youth as a means to collective power. On January 8, Miller apologized for having quoted Hitler in the message, but accused critics of twisting her words.

Personal life 
Miller is married to fellow Republican politician Chris Miller. They own a farm in Oakland, near Charleston, where they grow grain and raise cattle. They have seven children and 17 grandchildren. The Millers are members of Oakland Christian Church.

References

External links

 of Rep. Miller
 Mary Miller for Congress
 
 

|-

1959 births
21st-century American politicians
21st-century American women politicians
American nationalists
American Protestants
Christians from Illinois
Christian nationalists
Eastern Illinois University alumni
Farmers from Illinois
Far-right politicians in the United States
Female members of the United States House of Representatives
Living people
People from Naperville, Illinois
People from Oakland, Illinois
People from Oak Park, Illinois
Protestants from Illinois
Republican Party members of the United States House of Representatives from Illinois
Right-wing politics in the United States
Right-wing populism in the United States
Women in Illinois politics